The Massangis Solar Park is a 56 megawatt (MW) photovoltaic power station in France. It uses about 700,000 thin-film CdTe-panels made by First Solar. Commissioned in stages beginning in the spring of 2012.

See also 

Photovoltaic power station
List of photovoltaic power stations

References 

Photovoltaic power stations in France
Buildings and structures in Yonne